Krishna Murari Sharan is an Indian politician from Bihar and a Member of the Bihar Legislative Assembly. Sharan won the Hilsa Assembly constituency on JD(U) ticket in the 2020 Bihar Legislative Assembly election.

References

Living people
Bihar MLAs 2020–2025
Janata Dal (United) politicians
Year of birth missing (living people)